Karyrie is a town in the Shire of Buloke, Victoria, Australia. Karyrie had a station on the Mildura railway line which is now closed between Kinnabulla station and Birchip station. The post office in the locality opened on 19 November 1892 and was closed on 15 November 1919.

References